The 2013 Baku Cup was a professional tennis tournament played on hard courts. This was the third edition of the tournament, which was part of the 2013 WTA Tour. It took place in Baku, Azerbaijan between 22 and 28 July 2013.

Singles main-draw entrants

Seeds

 1 Rankings are as of July 15, 2013.

Other entrants
The following players received wildcards into the singles main draw:
  Kamilla Farhad
  Ons Jabeur
  Nazrin Jafarova

The following players received entry from the qualifying draw:
  Tetyana Arefyeva
  Oksana Kalashnikova
  Veronika Kapshay
  Kateryna Kozlova
  Magda Linette
  Tereza Martincová

The following players entered by using a Protected Ranking:
  Michaëlla Krajicek

Withdrawals
Before the tournament
  Tímea Babos
  Annika Beck
  Estrella Cabeza Candela
  Caroline Garcia
  Karin Knapp
  Romina Oprandi
  Pauline Parmentier
  Andrea Petkovic

Retirements
  Ons Jabeur (ankle injury)

Doubles main-draw entrants

Seeds

 1 Rankings are as of July 15, 2013.

Other entrants 
The following pairs received wildcards into the doubles main draw:
  Tamari Chalaganidze /  Nazrin Jafarova
  Kamilla Farhad /  Sabina Sharipova

Champions

Singles

  Elina Svitolina def.  Shahar Pe'er, 6–4, 6–4

Doubles

  Irina Buryachok /  Oksana Kalashnikova def.  Eleni Daniilidou /  Aleksandra Krunić, 4–6, 7–6(7–3), [10–4]

External links
 Official website

Baku Cup
Baku Cup
2013 in Azerbaijani sport